Young Buffalos FC is a Swazi football club based in Mbabane. They are one of the main sports clubs in the country.

Achievements
Swazi Premier League: 2
 2010, 2020

Swazi Cup: 3
 2017, 2018, 2019

Swazi Charity Cup: 0
 Runners-up 2001, 2012, 2013

Performance in CAF competitions
CAF Champions League: 1 appearance
2011 – First Round

CAF Confederation Cup: 5 appearances
2018 - Preliminary Round
2019 - Preliminary Round
2020 - First Round
2021 - Play-off Round
2022 - First Round

Football clubs in Eswatini
Manzini, Eswatini